The 2012 Super Fours was the ninth cricket Super Fours season. It took place in May and saw 4 teams compete in 50 over and Twenty20 matches. There was no overall winner in the 50 over tournament, whilst Rubies won the Twenty20 tournament, their second title in the format.

Competition format
In the one day tournament, each team played two games, with no overall winner declared.

The Twenty20 competition consisted of two semi-finals, with the winners progressing to a Final and the losers playing in a third-place play-off.

Teams

50 over

Results

Twenty20

Semi-finals

Third-place play-off

Final

References

Super Fours
2012 in English women's cricket